Hélène Boivin (born 13 February 1959) is a Canadian former swimmer. She competed in the women's 100 metre butterfly at the 1976 Summer Olympics.

References

External links
 

1959 births
Living people
Canadian female swimmers
Olympic swimmers of Canada
Swimmers at the 1976 Summer Olympics
Swimmers at the 1978 Commonwealth Games
Commonwealth Games medallists in swimming
Commonwealth Games gold medallists for Canada
Commonwealth Games silver medallists for Canada
Sportspeople from Saguenay, Quebec
20th-century Canadian women
21st-century Canadian women
Medallists at the 1978 Commonwealth Games